This is a list of local rulers of Vojvodina. The list also include local rulers of Banat, Bačka and Srem, including parts of mentioned regions, which are not part of present-day Vojvodina, as well as other rulers of larger political units that had specific local ties to territory of present-day Vojvodina.

Ancient times

Roman emperors
Maximinus, Roman emperor (235–238), ruled from residence in Sirmium
Decius Traian, Roman emperor (249–251), born in village Budalia near Sirmium
Ingenuus, Roman emperor (260), proclaimed himself emperor in Sirmium
Regalianus, Roman emperor (260), proclaimed himself emperor in Sirmium
Claudius II, Roman emperor (268–270), spent most of his life in Sirmium
Aurelian, Roman emperor (270–275), born in Sirmium
Probus, Roman emperor (276–282), born in Sirmium
Maximianus Herculius, Roman emperor (285–310), born near Sirmium
Galerius, Roman emperor (305–311), ruled as Caesar during the Tetrarchy from residence in Sirmium (293–296)
Crispus, a Caesar of the Roman Empire. He was proclaimed Caesar in Sirmium in 317
Constantine II, a Caesar of the Roman Empire. He was proclaimed Caesar in Sirmium in 317
Vetranion, Roman emperor. Proclaimed himself emperor in Sirmium (in 350)
Constantius II, Roman emperor (337–361), born in Sirmium
Gratian, Roman emperor (367–383), born in Sirmium
Theodosius I the Great, Roman emperor (378–395). He became emperor in Sirmium

Roman prefects
Valerius Licinius, prefect of the Diocese of Pannonia with residence in Sirmium (308–314)
Apricanus, prefect of the Pannonia Secunda province with residence in Sirmium (355)
Aurelius Victor, prefect of the Pannonia Secunda province (in the time of the emperor Julijan)
Messala, prefect of the Pannonia Secunda province (373)
Petronius Probus, prefect in Sirmium (374)
Leontius, prefect of the Prefecture of Illyricum with residence in Sirmium (426)
Apraemis, prefect of the Prefecture of Illyricum with residence in Sirmium (before 441)

Other
Illyrian rulers
Baton, one of three leaders of Illyrian uprising against Romans in Pannonia and Dalmatia in 6 AD.
Pinnes, one of three leaders of Illyrian uprising against Romans in Pannonia and Dalmatia in 6 AD.
Iazyge rulers
Bakadaspes, ruler of Iazyges (before 180).
Zanticus, king of Iazyges (2nd century).
Beuca or Beukan, king of Iazyges (470/472).
Babay or Babai, king of Iazyges (470/472).
Hun rulers
Uldin, khan of the Western Huns, ruler of Banat (390–411).
Charaton
Octar and Rua
Rua alone.
Bleda and Attila
Attila alone.
Ellak
Gepid rulers
 Ardaric king of Gepidia (Banat, Eastern Sirmia, Western Oltenia).
 Giesmus
 Thraustila, king of the Gepids with residence in Sirmium (473).
 Trasseric
 Gunderith (together with Trasseric)
 Mundus and Elemund
 Elemund alone
 Thurisind
 Cunimund, king of the Gepids with residence in Sirmium.
Longobard ruler (Gausian)
Alboin

Middle Ages
Avar administration
Kuber, ruler of Syrmia (7th century)
Buta-ul, Avar noble, ruler of Banat and Bačka (796)
Bulgarian dukes
Salan, Bulgarian duke, ruler of Bačka (9th century)
Glad, Bulgarian duke, ruler of Banat (9th century)
Ahtum, Bulgarian duke, ruler of Banat (11th century)
Sermon, Bulgarian duke, ruler of Syrmia (11th century)
Byzantine local rulers
Constantine Diogenes, archon of Sirmium (1018–1028)
Local rulers during administration of the Kingdom of Hungary
Giletus, duke of Syrmia (1231)
Stefan Lazarević, Serbian despot (1402–1427)
Đurađ Branković, Serbian despot (1427–1456)
Vuk Grgurević, Serbian despot (1471–1485)
Lovro Iločki, duke of Syrmia (1477–1524)
Đorđe Branković, Serbian despot (1486–1496)
Jovan Branković, Serbian despot (1496–1502)
Ivaniš Berislav, Serbian despot (1504–1514)
Stefan Berislav, Serbian despot (1520–1535)
Radič Božić, Serbian despot (1527–1528)
Pavle Bakić, Serbian despot (1537)
Stefan Štiljanović, Serbian despot (1537–1540)
Rulers of Syrmia
Stefan Dragutin, king of Lower Syrmia (1282–1316)
Stefan Vladislav II, king of Lower Syrmia (1316–1325)
Ugrin Čak, ruler of Upper Syrmia (before 1311)
Serb rulers
Jovan Nenad, self-proclaimed Serbian emperor (1526–1527)
Radoslav Čelnik, duke of Syrmia (1527–1530)

Modern times

Ottoman Empire
Eyalet of Temeşvar
Kazim-bey or Gazi Kasim-pasha, beylerbey of the Eyalet of Temeşvar (1552–1554)
Hasan-pasha, beylerbey of the Eyalet of Temeşvar (1594)
Sofi Sinan-pasha, beylerbey of the Eyalet of Temeşvar (1594)
Hasan-pasha (the younger), beylerbey of the Eyalet of Temeşvar (1594)
Ibrahim-pasha, beylerbey of the Eyalet of Temeşvar (1687)
Ibrahim-pasha, beylerbey of the Eyalet of Temeşvar (1701-)
Sanjak of Segedin
Hasan Predojević, bey of the Sanjak of Segedin (1592)
Banat uprising
Teodor Nestorović, leader of the Banat uprising (1594)
Sava ban, leader of the Banat uprising (1594)
Velja Mironić, leader of the Banat uprising (1594)

Habsburg Monarchy
Appointed leader of Habsburg Serbs
Jovan Monasterlija, vice-duke of Serbs (1691–1706)
Banat of Temeswar
Claudius Mercy, governor of the Banat of Temeswar
Franz Leopold Engelshofen, governor of the Banat of Temeswar
Tican's Rebellion
Teodor Avramović Tican, leader of the rebellion (1807)
Serbian Vojvodina
Stevan Šupljikac, Voivod (Duke) of Serbian Vojvodina (1848)
Josif Rajačić, administrator of Serbian Vojvodina (1848–1849)
Great Voivodes of the Voivodeship of Serbia and Banat of Temeschwar
Franz Joseph I, Emperor of Austria and Great Voivod (Great Duke) of Voivodship of Serbia (1849–1916)
Karl I, Emperor of Austria and Great Voivod (Great Duke) of Voivodship of Serbia (1916–1918)
Governors of the Voivodeship of Serbia and Banat of Temeschwar
Ferdinand Mayerhofer, governor (1849–1851)
Johann Coronini-Cronberg, governor (1851–1859)
Josip Šokčević, governor (1859–1860)
Karl August von Bigot de Saint-Quentin, governor (1860)

After 1918
Banat Republic
Dr. Otto Roth, Commissioner-in-Chief of the Banat Republic (1918–1919)
Banat, Bačka and Baranja
Dr. Jovan Lalošević, president of the People's administration for Banat, Bačka and Baranja (1918–1919)
Slavko Miletić, President of the Great People's Council  (1918–1919)
Bans of Danube Banovina (1929–1941):
Daka Popović (1929–1930)
Radoslav Dunjić (1930)
Svetomir Matić (1930–1931)
Milan Nikolić (1931–1933)
Dobrica Matković (1933–1935)
Milojko Vasović (1935)
Svetislav Paunović (1935–1936)
Svetislav Rajić (1936–1939)
Jovan Radivojević (1939–1940)
Branko Kijurina (1940–1941)
Milorad Vlaškalin (1941)
Civilian Commissioner of Banat:
Joseph-Sepp Lapp (1941–1944).
 Presidents of the Presidency of Vojvodina (1974–1991):

 Radovan Vlajković (1974–1981).
 Predrag Vladisavljević (1981–1982).
 Danilo Kekić (1982–1983).
 Đorđe Radosavljević (1983–1984).
 Nandor Major (1984–1985).
 Predrag Vladisavljević (1985–1986).
 Đorđe Radosavljević (1986–1988).
 Nandor Major (1988–1989).
 Jugoslav Kostić (1989–1991).
 Presidents of the Government of Vojvodina: 
 Aleksandar Šević (1945–1948).
 Luka Mrkšić (1948–1953).
 Stevan Doronjski (1953).
 Geza Tikvicki (1953–1962).
 Đurica Jojkić (1962–1963).
 Ilija Rajačić (1963–1967).
 Stipan Marušić (1967–1971).
 Franjo Nađ (1971–1974).
 Nikola Kmezić (1974–1982).
 Živan Marelj (1982–1986).
 Jon Srbovan (1986–1989).
 Sredoje Erdeljan (1989).
 Jovan Radić (1989–1991).
 Radoman Božović (1991).
 Jovan Radić (1991–1992).
 Koviljko Lovre (1992–1993).
 Boško Perošević (1993–2000).
 Damnjan Radenković (2000).
 Đorđe Đukić (2000–2004).
 Bojan Pajtić (since 2004).
 Presidents of the Assembly of Vojvodina: 
 Aleksandar Šević (1945–1946).
 Mateja Matejić, Ivan Melvinger, Đorđe Marinković (1946–1947).
 Jovan Doroški, Đurica Jojkić, Isa Jovanović (1947–1948).
 Đurica Jojkić (1948–1950).
 Petar Milovanović (1950–1951).
 Danilo Kekić (1951–1953).
 Luka Mrkšić, Stevan Doronjski (1953–1958).
 Stevan Doronjski (1958–1963).
 Radovan Vlajković (1963–1967).
 Ilija Rajačić (1967–1973).
 Sreta Kovačević (1973).
 Vilmoš Molnar (1974–1982).
 Đorđe Stojšić (1982–1983).
 Ištvan Rajcan (1983–1984).
 Dobrivoj Radić (1984–1985).
 Rudi Sova (1985–1986).
 Dobrivoj Radić (1986–1988).
 Živan Marelj (1988–1989).
 Janoš Šreder (1989).
 Branko Kljajić, Verona Ádám Bokros (1989–1991).
 Damnjan Radenković (1991–1992).
 Svetislav Krstić (1992–1993).
 Milutin Stojković (1993–1997).
 Živorad Smiljanić (1997–2000).
 Nenad Čanak (2000–2004).
 Bojan Kostreš (2004–2008).
 Sándor Egeresi (2008–2012).
 István Pásztor (since 2012).

Gallery

See also
Vojvodina
List of Serbian monarchs
History of Vojvodina
History of Serbia

References

Literature
 
 Petar Milošević, Arheologija i istorija Sirmijuma, Novi Sad, 2001.
 Aleksa Ivić, Istorija Srba u Vojvodini, Novi Sad, 1929.
 Dušan J. Popović, Srbi u Vojvodini, knjige 1–3, Novi Sad, 1990.
 Milan Tutorov, Mala Raška a u Banatu, Zrenjanin, 1991.
 Drago Njegovan, Prisajedinjenje Vojvodine Srbiji, Novi Sad, 2004.

External links
 www.worldstatesmen.org
 Historical background of the Banovina Palace
 www.portalestoria.net
 Yugoslav republics

Vojvodina
Rulers
Vojvodina